Naname de Magic! is a 1994 Japan-exclusive puzzle arcade game. It plays similar to Hebereke no Popoon. Like Super Puzzle Fighter 2 Turbo, the characters are super-deformed (with the first boss looking very similar to Wolfgang Krauser of the Fatal Fury series) with an exception of some of the bosses in the final stages. Another reason it links to this Capcom game, a special system is activated to defeat an opponent. One would have to stack the element icons diagonally to attack the opponent, unlike to its comparing counterpart.

Availability
The cabinet version is extremely rare. It is still playable through MAME or similar emulators.

Characters
Frain - Element: Fire
Once a player has inserted their coins for story mode, they have to play as Frain. One day, there is panic in a nearby village, and Frain is trying to find out what's going on. Rei tells Frain that someone took Elena and she must be brought back to safety.
 
These characters are only playable in versus mode:
Rei - Element: Wind
Sala - Element: Water
Dio - Element: Plant
Datta - Element: Earth
Elena - Element: Light

These characters appear in story mode, but are not playable:
Burn - Element: Fire
Kein - Element: Plant
Aria - Element: Water
Goras - Element: Earth
Garam - Element: Wind
D-Frain - Element: Fire
Guru - Element: Dark
The main villain of the story. He kidnapped Elena, and brainwashed her to fight Frain late into the game. Fortunately, Frain is able to save her and defeat Guru.

Legacy
A non-Japanese player wouldn't know how to play the game without viewing the tutorial in attraction mode.

Video games developed in Japan